Kenneth Helfrich (28 March 1927 – 15 February 1982) was a South African cricketer who played first-class cricket for Griqualand West and North-Eastern Transvaal between 1950 and 1959. He was the youngest of four brothers who all played first-class cricket.

Helfrich played irregularly in first-class cricket: eight matches in 11 seasons. In his second match he made 87 and took 5 for 46 for Griqualand West against Eastern Province. In 1956–57, in his first match for North-Eastern Transvaal, he scored 71 in a team total of 125 against the touring MCC; Wisden noted: "Helfrich, who batted without gloves, made several fine drives in a stay of two and a half hours. Extras was the next best score."

References

External links

1927 births
1982 deaths
South African cricketers
Griqualand West cricketers
Northerns cricketers
Cricketers from Kimberley, Northern Cape